Örentaş can refer to:

 Örentaş, Adilcevaz
 Örentaş, Köprüköy